Robert James Abernethy (born 1971) was an Australian swimmer specialising in freestyle sprint events. He is best known for winning the bronze medal at the inaugural 1993 FINA Short Course World Championships in Palma de Mallorca, Spain. He also competed for his native country at the 1995 Summer Universiade in Fukuoka, Japan.

On 23 June 2000, he was awarded the Australian Sports Medal.

References

External links
 
 eswimmer

1971 births
Living people
Arizona Wildcats men's swimmers
Recipients of the Australian Sports Medal
Medalists at the FINA World Swimming Championships (25 m)
Australian male freestyle swimmers